The 2013–14 Lithuanian Hockey League season was the 23rd season of the Lithuanian Hockey League, the top level of ice hockey in Lithuania. 14 teams participated in the league, and Kaliningrado Delovaja Rus won the championship.

Regular season

Eastern Division

Central Division

Western Division

(*Withdrew from the league after two games.)

Playoffs

Quarterfinals
Kauno Baltų-Ainiai 11 - Kauno Sparnai-Staklės 5
Kaliningrado Delovaja Rus 11 - Vilnius Hockey Punks 1
Bizonai Kaunas II 2 - Šiaulių Ledo linija 5
Elektrėnų Lokiai-Poseidonas 1 - Rokiškio Rokiškis 2

Semifinals
Kaliningrado Delovaja Rus 7 - Šiaulių Ledo linija 0 
Kauno Baltų-Ainiai 0 - Rokiškio Rokiškis 4

3rd place game
Kauno Baltų-Ainiai 1 - Šiaulių Ledo linija 10

Final
 Kaliningrado Delovaja Rus 11 - Rokiškio Rokiškis 4

External links
 Lithuanian Ice Hockey Federation website

Lith
Lithuania Hockey League seasons
2013 in Lithuanian sport
2014 in Lithuanian sport